Gregory Nagy (born October 22, 1942 in Budapest) is an American professor of Classics at Harvard University, specializing in Homer and archaic Greek poetry. Nagy is known for extending Milman Parry and Albert Lord's theories about the oral composition-in-performance of the Iliad and Odyssey.

Education and career
Nagy received his A.B. from Indiana University in 1962 in classics and linguistics, and his Ph.D. from Harvard University in 1966 in classical philology.

Since 1966, he has been a professor at Harvard University.

Since 2000, he has been the director of the Center for Hellenic Studies, a Harvard-affiliated research institution in Washington, DC. He is the Francis Jones Professor of Classical Greek Literature and Professor of Comparative literature at Harvard, and continues to teach half-time at the Harvard campus in Cambridge, Massachusetts. From 1994 to 2000, he served as Chair of the Classics Department at Harvard University. He was Chair of Harvard's undergraduate Literature Concentration from 1989 to 1994. He served as the president of the American Philological Association in the academic year 1990-91.

Since 2015, he has been posting his current work on a weekly basis at his research blog, Classical Inquiries.

Massive open online course
In 2013 Harvard offered his popular class, The Ancient Greek Hero, which thousands of Harvard students had taken over the last few decades, through edX as a massive open online course. To assist Professor Nagy, Harvard appealed to alumni to volunteer as online mentors and discussion group managers. About 10 former teaching fellows have also volunteered. The task of the volunteers is to focus online class discussion on the course material. The course had 27,000 students registered.

Personal life
Nagy and his wife, Olga Davidson, Research Fellow, Institute for the Study of Muslim Societies and Civilizations, Boston University and chair of the Ilex Foundation, served as Faculty Deans (previously called co-masters) of Currier House at Harvard from 1986 to 1990.

Nagy has two brothers in allied fields: Blaise Nagy is a professor emeritus of Classics at the College of the Holy Cross in Worcester, Massachusetts, while Joseph F. Nagy is the Henry L. Shattuck Professor of Irish Studies in the Department of Celtic Languages and Literatures at Harvard University.

Works

Books

As sole author

 Nagy, Gregory, Greek Dialects and the Transformation of an Indo-European Process (Harvard University Press, 1970)
 Nagy, Gregory, Comparative Studies in Greek and Indic Meter (Harvard University Press, 1974)
 Nagy, Gregory, The Best of the Achaeans: Concepts of the Hero in Archaic Greek Poetry, Revised Edition  (Johns Hopkins University Press, 1998; original publication, 1979)
 Nagy, Gregory, Greek Mythology and Poetics (Cornell University Press, 1990)
 Nagy, Gregory, Pindar's Homer: The Lyric Possession of an Epic Past  (Johns Hopkins University Press, 1990)
 Nagy, Gregory, Poetry as performance. Homer and beyond. (Cambridge University Press, 1996)
 Nagy, Gregory, Homeric Questions (University of Texas Press, 1996)
 Nagy, Gregory, Plato's Rhapsody and Homer's Music : The Poetics of the Panathenaic Festival in Classical Athens (Harvard University Press, 2002)
 Nagy, Gregory, Homeric Responses (University of Texas Press, 2003)
 Nagy, Gregory, Homer's Text And Language (University of Illinois Press, 2004)
Nagy, Gregory, Homer the Classic       (Harvard University Press, 2009)
 Nagy, Gregory, Homer: The Preclassic (University of California Press, 2010)
 Nagy, Gregory,  The Ancient Greek Hero in 24 Hours (Harvard University Press, 2013)

As editor or co-editor

 Victor Bers and Nagy, G. eds., The Classics In East Europe: From the End of World War II to the Present (American Philological Association Pamphlet Series, 1996)
 Nicole Loraux, Nagy, G., and Slatkin, L., eds., Postwar French Thought vol. 3, Antiquities (New Press, 2001)
 Nagy, Gregory ed. with very brief introductions to collections of reprinted articles, Greek Literature (Taylor and Francis, London, 2001; Routledge, 2002), 9 vols.

Articles
 Nagy, Gregory, "The Professional Muse and Models of Prestige in Ancient Greece," Cultural Critique 12 (1989) 133–143
 Nagy, Gregory, "Early Greek Views of Poets and Poetry," in: The Cambridge History of Literary Criticism, vol. 1 (ed. G. Kennedy; Cambridge 1989; paperback 1993) 1–77
 Nagy, Gregory, "The Crisis of Performance," in: The Ends of Rhetoric: History, Theory, Practice (ed. J. Bender and D.E. Wellbery; Stanford 1990) 43–59
 Nagy, Gregory, "Distortion diachronique dans l'art homérique: quelques précisions," in: Constructions du temps dans le monde ancien (ed. C. Darbo-Peschanski; Paris 2000) 417–426.
 Nagy, Gregory, “The Name of Achilles: Questions of Etymology and ‘Folk-Etymology.’” Illinois Classical Studies 19 (1994): 3–9. http://www.jstor.org/stable/23065415.

References

External links
Nagy's website at the Harvard Department of the Classics
An audio interview with Nagy on "New Books in Classics"
An account of Nagy's pioneering new project "A Homer Commentary in Progress"
A Homer Commentary in Progress - An evolving, collaborative commentary with Nagy among the commentators

American classical scholars
1942 births
Living people
Classical scholars of Harvard University
Hungarian emigrants to the United States
Harvard University alumni
Indiana University alumni